Shadows Over Rangoon is a novel by F. J. Thwaites.

References

External links
Shadows Over Rangoon at AustLit

1941 Australian novels